During the 1963–64 Scottish football season, Celtic competed in Scottish Division One.

Results

Scottish Division One

Scottish Cup

Scottish League Cup

European Cup Winners' Cup

Glasgow Cup

References

Celtic F.C. seasons
Celtic